This is a list of the killed and politically disappeared people during the Brazilian military dictatorship. It brings together the political dead and disappeared in the Brazilian military dictatorship of 1964. The murders and disappearances of opponents of the military regime in Brazil were investigated by the National Truth Commission (CNV), by state truth commissions, by human rights entities and by victims' own relatives. In these various investigations, there is a discrepancy in the numbers of deaths and missing persons computed. The CNV, in its final report, recognized 434 political deaths and disappearances between 1946 and 1988, of which the majority occurred during the dictatorship.

Included in the list are cases found by:

 Special Commission on Political Deaths and Disappearances, established in 1995 and linked to the Human Rights Secretariat of the Presidency of the Republic, which accounted for 362 cases of political deaths and disappearances;
 Documentation Center Eremias Delizoicov and the Commission of Family Members of the Dead and Missing Politicians, which, in 2010, organized a website listing 383 political dead and missing persons;
 Memories of the Dictatorship, carried out by the Vladimir Herzog Institute, based on documents and data collected by CNV;
 Truth Commission of the State of São Paulo "Rubens Paiva", associated with the CNV and located in the Legislative Assembly of the State of São Paulo, with a focus on State crimes perpetrated in that state;
 National Truth Commission, volume 3, "Political dead and missing persons", published in December 2014.

List

A

B

C

D

E

F

G

H

I

J

K

L

M

N

O

P

R

S

T

U

V

W

Y

Z

References

Major sources